Mersin Province is a Mediterraneran province of Turkey. The south eastern plain of the province is a part of Çukurova (or historically Cilicia Pedias ). But most of the province is mountainous with a number of small alluvial plains at the coastal band. Below are the transport facilities of the province.

Railroad 

There are two railroads. One line (constructed in 1882) connects Mersin to Adana at the east. That line known as Adana–Mersin Railway Line has 7 stops in Mersin Province most of which are used by the commuter trains. Mersin Railway Station is the southernmost train terminal of Turkey and by a tail line it is connected to Port of Mersin. Tarsus Railway Station is in Tarsus,  the second most populous city of the province. Yenice Railway Station in Yenice town is another important station, because it is the connection point of the Adana Mersin line and a second line from the Central Anatolia .

Highways 
The following table lists the motorways and state highways in Mersin. The so-called Province roads which connect district centers to each other and the village roads are not shown.

Ports
There are several sea ports with harbor infrastructure. The most important port of the province (and one of the most important in Turkey) is the Port of Mersin.(For the infrastructure see Mersin Harbor). In the town of Taşucu (Holmi of the antiquity) near Silifke, there are two smaller ports. The rest in Bozyazı, Aydıncık, Yeşilovacık and Karaduvar ( east of Mersin) are even smaller fishing ports. There are two marinas, Mersin Marina and Kumkuyu Marina in Kumkuyu town of Erdemli district.

Airport
At the moment there are no airports in the province. But a larger airport for all Çukurova is under planning. The new airport (Çukurova Airport) will be in Mersin Province.

References